Conole is a surname. Notable people with the surname include:

 Gráinne Conole (born 1964), Irish academic
 Reg Conole (1902–1967), Australian rules footballer

See also
 Connole (disambiguation)